The 1st FINA World Junior Synchronised Swimming Championships was held July 17-23, 1989 in Cali, Colombia. The synchronised swimmers are aged between 15 and 18 years old, swimming in three events: Solo, Duet and Team.

Participating nations
Aruba 
Brazil 
Canada 
China 
Colombia 
France 
Great Britain 
Italy 
Japan 
Netherlands 
Soviet Union 
Sweden 
United States

Results

References

FINA World Junior Synchronised Swimming Championships
1989 in synchronized swimming
Swimming
Jun
International aquatics competitions hosted by Colombia
Synchronised swimming in Colombia